

The Modoc Plateau lies in the northeast corner of California as well as parts of Oregon and Nevada.  Nearly  of the Modoc National Forest are on the plateau between the Medicine Lake Highlands in the west and the Warner Mountains in the east.

Its landform is volcanic table land ranging from 4,000 to 6,000 feet above sea level, cut by many north–south faults. "Occasioned lakes, marshes, and sluggishly flowing streams meander across the plateau."

It is a thick accumulation of lava flows and tuff beds, along with many small volcanic cones. It has cinder cones, juniper flats, pine forests, and seasonal lakes. The plateau is thought to have been formed approximately 25 million years ago as a southern extension of the Columbia Plateau flood basalts.

Vegetation and wildlife
Forested areas of the plateau include Ponderosa Pine (Pinus ponderosa), as well as other tree species such as California Buckeye (Aesculus californica). and Modoc Cypress (Cupressus bakeri).

The plateau supports large herds of Mule Deer (Odocoileus hemionus), Rocky Mountain Elk (Cervus canadensis), and Pronghorn (Antilocapra americana). There are also several herds of wild horses on the plateau. The Clear Lake National Wildlife Refuge and Long Bell State Game Refuge are located on the plateau as well.

Watersheds
The Lost River watershed drains the north part of the plateau, while southern watersheds either collect in basin reservoirs or flow into the large Big Sage Reservoir, which sits in the center of Modoc County.

See also
List of plants on the Modoc National Forest

References

 
Plateaus of the United States
Landforms of California
Landforms of the Great Basin
California placenames of Native American origin
Regions of California
Volcanic fields of California
Volcanic fields of Nevada
Volcanic fields of Oregon
Landforms of Modoc County, California
Landforms of Lake County, Oregon
Landforms of Lassen County, California
Landforms of Siskiyou County, California
Landforms of Shasta County, California
Landforms of Washoe County, Nevada